G Girls was a Romanian girl supergroup, which was created by their label Global Records. It initially consisted of Inna, Antonia, Loredana Ciobotaru (Lori) and Alexandra Stan; the latter one later departed and was replaced with Lariss. The group experienced commercial success with their debut single, "Call the Police" (2016), which peaked at number six in Poland.

History
G Girls started in 2016 through the suggestion of record label Global Records. For their debut single, "Call the Police" (2016), the group consisted of Inna, Alexandra Stan, Antonia, and Lori. The song was commercially successful, peaking at number 64 on Romania's Airplay 100 and at number six in Poland. The band released the music video for their second single, "Milk & Honey", on 3 March 2017. Stan was replaced with Romanian singer Lariss. The song peaked at number 67 in their native country.

Discography

Singles

References

Supergroups (music)
Vocal quartets
Girl groups
Romanian pop music groups
Romanian women singers
Romanian musical groups
Musical groups established in 2016
2016 establishments in Romania